Kenji Sakaguchi may refer to:

 Kenji Sakaguchi (footballer), Japanese footballer
 Kenji Sakaguchi (actor), Japanese actor